Qomsheh-ye Seyyed Qasem (also Romanized as Qomsheh-ye Seyyed Qāsem) is a village in Mahidasht Rural District, Mahidasht District, Kermanshah County, Kermanshah Province, Iran. At the 2006 census, its population was 494, in 121 families.

References 

Populated places in Kermanshah County